Robert Frost Middle School may refer to one of the following schools in the United States:

Robert Frost Middle School (Montgomery County, Maryland)
Robert Frost Middle School (Fairfax County, Virginia)
  Robert Frost Middle School - Los Angeles, California
  Robert Frost Middle School - Deer Park, New York
  Robert Frost Middle School - Livonia, Michigan